Impressions is the tenth studio album by American jazz trumpeter Chris Botti, which was released on April 17, 2012 through Columbia Records. The album debuted and peaked No. 1 on the Billboard Jazz Album chart. On February 10, 2013, the album received the Grammy Award for Best Pop Instrumental Album.

Track listing

Personnel 
 Chris Botti – trumpet (1-13), arrangements (10)
 Billy Childs – acoustic piano (1, 7)
 Jim Cox – acoustic piano (2, 13), arrangements (13)
 David Foster – arrangements (2, 10, 11), acoustic piano (10), keyboards (11)
 John Barlow Jarvis – acoustic piano (5)
 Herbie Hancock – acoustic piano (6)
 Walter Afanasieff – keyboards (7, 9), arrangements (9), choir vocals (9)
 Geoffrey Keezer – acoustic piano (8)
 Guy Fletcher – Fender Rhodes (13)
 Leonardo Amuedo – guitar (2, 3, 5, 7, 8, 12)
 Ramón Stagnaro – guitar (11)
 Mark Knopfler – electric guitar (13), vocals (13)
 Richard Bennett – acoustic guitar (13)
 Robert Hurst – bass (1, 6, 7, 11)
 David Hungate – bass (5)
 Michael Valerio – bass (8)
 Glenn Worf – bass (13)
 Vinnie Colaiuta – drums (1, 5, 6, 7, 11)
 Ian Thomas – drums (13)
 Alex Acuña – percussion (3, 9, 11)
 Pedro Eustache – duduk (9)
 Caroline Campbell – orchestra contractor (1, 2, 5, 6, 8, 11, 12), violin (8)
 Isobel Griffiths – orchestra contractor (3, 7, 9, 13)
 Vince Mendoza – arrangements and conductor (1, 6)
 William Ross – arrangements and conductor (2, 5, 8, 11, 12), arrangements (9)
 Gil Goldstein – arrangements (3, 13)
 Jaques Morelenbaum – orchestra conductor (3, 13), arrangements and conductor (7)
 Ben Foster – orchestra conductor (9)
 Andrea Bocelli – vocals (2)
 Vince Gill – vocals (5)
 Lisa Fischer – choir vocals (9)
 Tanja Tzarovska – vocals (9)

Production 
 Bobby Colomby – producer (1-8, 10, 11, 12), management 
 Walter Afanasieff – producer (9)
 Mark Knopfler – producer (13)
 Allen Sides – engineer (1-12), mixing (1-13), recording (1, 4, 6, 10), instrumental recording (2, 3, 5, 7, 8, 9, 11, 12), orchestra recording (2, 5, 8, 11, 12)
 Jorge Vivo – vocal recording (2)
 Haydn Bendall – orchestra recording (3, 7, 9, 13), vocal recording (9)
 Drew Bollman – instrumental recording (5), vocal recording (5)
 Matt Rausch – instrumental recording (5), vocal recording (5)
 Tyler Gordon – keyboard recording (7, 9), choir vocal recording (9)
 Chuck Ainlay – engineer (13), recording (13)
 Joe Kearnes – second engineer (13)
 Scott Moore – Pro Tools operator (1-9, 11, 12)
 Tim Lauber – Pro Tools operator (2, 5, 8, 10, 11, 12)
 Jochem van der Saag – Pro Tools operator (2), instrumental recording (11)
 Fiona Cruikshank – Pro Tools operator (3, 7, 9, 13)
 Eric Boulanger – mastering 
 Doug Sax – mastering 
 Matt Evers – production coordinator 
 Fabrizio Ferri – photography 
 Archie Castillo – management

Studios 
 Recorded at Ocean Way Recording and Newman Scoring Stage (Hollywood, CA); Chartmaker Studios (Malibu, CA); Record One (Los Angeles, CA); The House (New Canaan, CT); British Grove and AIR Lyndhurst Hall (London, UK).
 Mixed at Ocean Way Recording.
 Mastered at The Mastering Lab (Ojai, CA).

Charts

References

Chris Botti albums
2012 albums
Columbia Records albums
Instrumental albums
Grammy Award for Best Contemporary Instrumental Album
Albums produced by Bobby Colomby
albums produced by Walter Afanasieff
albums produced by Mark Knopfler
Albums recorded at AIR Studios